During the Victorian era, there were, as in all eras, certain social expectations that the separate genders were expected to adhere to in the United Kingdom and the British Empire.  The study of Victorian masculinity is based on the assumption that "the construction of male consciousness must be seen as historically specific."
The concept of Victorian masculinity is extremely diverse, since it was influenced by numerous aspects and factors such as domesticity, economy, gender roles, imperialism, manners, religion, sporting competition, and much more. Some of these aspects seem to be quite naturally related to one another, while others seem profoundly non-relational. For the males, this included a vast amount of pride in their work, a protectiveness over their wives, and an aptitude for good social behaviour.
The concept of Victorian masculinity is a topic of interest in the context of cultural studies with a special emphasis on gender studies. The topic is of  interest in the areas of history, literary criticism, religious studies, and sociology. Those values that have survived to the present day are of special interest to critics for their role in sustaining the 'dominance of the Western male'.

Origins
The study of Victorian masculinity is based on the assumption that "the construction of male consciousness must be seen as historically specific." As a result, men increasingly formed secret societies, such as the Masons and the Oddfellows. The Victorians saw manliness as good, a form of control over maleness, which was brutish.

Christianity and patriarchy
Christianity contributed to the Victorian concept of masculinity. The "real" Victorian man was to be spiritual and a faithful believer. Hence, the husband and father was considered to be the pater familias with extensive power. As the head of the household, his duty was not only to rule, but also to protect his wife and children.

Industrialism

Like in the private sphere, men of the Victorian era were equally active in the public sphere (in contrast to women). Work was crucial in order to achieve a fully masculine status. This was especially true for the middle-class man; male members of the aristocracy were seen as idle because they generally did not work. By being active in enterprise, men fulfilled their duty as breadwinners in the sense that they had to provide for their families. Since home and work were perceived as very separate spheres, working at home was a delicate matter, for example for writers, who had to fear their masculine status being threatened. Besides work, Victorian men were also active in the public sphere of clubs and taverns, indulging in homosociality.

The rise of scientific management principles also change the way other spheres like sport were viewed: there was a shift away from the early Victorian discourse of "fair play" as the most important aspect of sport, to one promoting "scientific" study of sport in order to win and make money.

Muscular Christianity
With the beginning of the second half of the 19th century the picture of the ideal of manliness started to shift. Due to publications such as Charles Darwin's The Origin of Species (1859), and  Friedrich Nietzsche's philosophical claims concerning the "death of God" (1882), the main focus in the concept of masculinity shifted from a spiritual focus on religion towards a commitment to muscle: 'muscular Christianity' was created. At the same time male domesticity decreased.

Sports and readiness for physical combat
The development towards a focus on muscle manifested itself in the belief that in order to educate one's mind one had to educate one's body. This assumption has its roots in the rise of natural science and especially biology. Thus, a fascination with health led to a sports and game playing mania, which was primarily acted out through the public school system for boys. The athlete was the new hero of society. This, according to E. M. Forster, then led to "well-developed bodies, fairly developed minds, and undeveloped hearts". Another reason for such drills was that by the end of the 19th century the British Empire was perceived to be in danger and athletic public school boys made good recruits.

Imperialism
In the second half of the 19th century the ideal of Victorian manliness became increasingly defined by imperialism because the subordination of non-western cultures was in its heyday in Britain. Thus, part of the concept of masculinity became military and patriotic virtue, which defined the ideal man as courageous and enduring like hunters, adventurers, and pioneers, all of whom were profoundly self-sufficient and independent and had broad scientific knowledge. This orientation towards hardiness and endurance was reflected by a change in clothing as well: rich colors and materials were discouraged in favor of dark colors, straight cuts, and stiff materials.

See also
 Masculinity
 Christian manliness

References

Bibliography
 
 
 
 
 
Tozer, Malcolm, Physical Education at Thring's Uppingham, Uppingham: Uppingham School, 1976. (ISBN B000XZ39VY).
Tozer, Malcolm, The Ideal of Manliness: The Legacy of Thring's Uppingham, Truro: Sunnyrest Books, 2015.

Victorian era
Masculinity
Social history of the United Kingdom
Social history of Canada
Social history of Australia
Social history of New Zealand
Social history of South Africa
Social history of India
Men's studies
British Empire
British India
Social history of Africa
Social history of the Caribbean
History of Hong Kong by topic
Social history of Oceania
Cultural hegemony
Social history of Ireland
Sports in popular culture
History of aesthetics
Christian movements
History of sports
History of human sexuality